The 1923 Fordham Maroon football team was an American football team that represented Fordham University as an independent during the 1923 college football season. In its fourth season under coach Frank Gargan, Fordham compiled a 4–7 record. College Football Data Warehouse does not record a second game against Mount Saint Mary's or the game against Gallaudet.

Schedule

References

Fordham
Fordham Rams football seasons
Fordham Maroon football